The 2016 Skyrunner World Series was the 15th edition of the global skyrunning competition, Skyrunner World Series, organised by the International Skyrunning Federation from 2002. 

From this edition is included a new category, Sky Extreme.

Results

Category Sky
Sky champions of the season are the Italian Tadei Pivk and the American Megan Kimmel.

Category Ultra

Category Vertical

Category Extreme

References

External links
 Skyrunner World Series

2016